The 1973 FIM Motocross World Championship was the 17th F.I.M. Motocross Racing World Championship season.

Summary

500cc championship
Roger De Coster won his third consecutive 500cc world championship for Suzuki ahead of West German rider, Willy Bauer. The championship wasn't decided until the final race in the Netherlands, when Bauer suffered a mechanical breakdown, losing the championship to De Coster by two points. Kawasaki joined the world championships with Brad Lackey in the 500cc class and Torleif Hansen in the 250cc class.

Suzuki's defense of the 500cc world championship was dealt a setback when, the FIM announced a new motorcycle minimum weight limit of 209 pounds just before the start of the season. European motorcycle manufacturers competing in the championship complained to the FIM that Suzuki was spending millions of dollars to build lightweight motorcycles that the smaller European manufacturers found impossible to compete with. Suzuki had already developed and built their race bikes so, there was no time to build new bikes. As a result, Suzuki resorted to adding ballast to the bikes. Unfortunately, these alterations threw the bikes out of balance and caused them to lose traction. To make matters worse, Maico and Yamaha had developed new rear suspensions with longer travel which helped transfer power to the rear wheel over rough terrain. The Suzuki management felt they were being unjustly treated by the FIM and were slow to react to developments by the other manufacturers.

Most of the Western European riders boycotted the Austrian 500cc round due to heavy snow on the track. As the season got underway, Yamaha's new "monoshock" rear suspension began to make an impact with Christer Hammargren winning a moto and Jaak van Velthoven taking the overall win at the Finnish Grand Prix. De Coster won both motos of the Italian Grand Prix but, Bauer came back with a hard fought victory in Czechoslovakia, relegating De Coster to second place in both motos and took the lead in the championship points tally. Bauer then took control of the championship by winning 5 out of the next 6 motos. Suzuki management's frustration at their perceived unfair treatment led to a lapse in support and, Suzuki team riders De Coster and Sylvain Geboers then took matters into their own hands by modifying their motorcycle's frames and developed new rear suspensions.

Going into the final race of the season at Sint Anthonis, Holland, Bauer was still holding the points lead but, the Suzukis were showing improvement. The Sint Anthonis track was composed of deep sand which robbed engines of power and increased fuel consumption. A Suzuki engineer calculated that their bike's gas tanks did not have sufficient capacity to finish the race. De Coster then took one of their tanks and drove two and a half hours to have the tank modified to increase its volume. He then drove back in time for the race. Despite having little sleep, De Coster scored two fourth-place finishes while Bauer suffered a mechanical failure handing De Coster his third consecutive 500cc world championship.

250cc championship
Håkan Andersson won the 250cc world championship to give Yamaha its first motocross world championship. Yamaha's new and innovative rear suspension with a single shock absorber made its debut at the third round in Belgium and was proven to be successful when Andersson won the overall victory. The new suspension design would go on to revolutionize the sport. Jim Pomeroy riding a privateer Bultaco, became the first American rider to win an overall victory in an FIM Motocross Grand Prix race when he won the season opening Spanish Grand Prix. His victory also marked the first Grand Prix victory for the Bultaco factory. Competitors from nine different manufacturers placed in the top ten of the 250cc championship final standings, reflecting the thriving vitality of the sport of motocross.

Grands Prix

500cc

250cc

Final standings

Points are awarded to the top 10 classified finishers.

500cc

250cc

References

External links
 

FIM Motocross World Championship season
Motocross World Championship seasons